Robert Stuart Bauer (name in , born 1946) is the honorary linguistics professor at the University of Hong Kong and formerly professor of Chinese linguistics at the Hong Kong Polytechnic University. He began his study of Cantonese in Taiwan from the United States in 1974 while he learning Mandarin, then he continued his studies as an exchange student at the Chinese University of Hong Kong in 1970s. Bauer later received his Ph.D. degree in linguistics from the University of California, Berkeley in 1982 and has taught linguistics at universities in Australia, China, Hong Kong, Japan, Taiwan, and Thailand. In 1997, he relocated to Hong Kong permanently, just before the city’s handover from British to Chinese sovereignty.

He is also the co-author of a number of Cantonese related linguistic publications, including Modern Cantonese Phonology, The Representation of Cantonese with Chinese Characters,,"ABC Cantonese-English Comprehensive Dictionary (published in December 31 2020)" etc. Apart from his research in Cantonese, he have also interested in other Yue dialects, the Thai language, and contact relationships among Chinese, Thai, Vietnamese, and minority languages of China and Southeast Asia.

See also
List of linguists

References

1946 births
Living people
Date of birth unknown
Place of birth unknown
UC Berkeley College of Letters and Science alumni
Academic staff of the University of Hong Kong 
American expatriates in Hong Kong
Linguists of Sino-Tibetan languages
Hong Kong people of American descent